Connie Sellecca (born Concetta Sellecchia; May 25, 1955) is an American actress, producer, and former model, best known for her roles on the television series Flying High, The Greatest American Hero, and Hotel, for which she was nominated for a Golden Globe Award for Best Actress – Television Series Drama in 1987.

Early life
Sellecca was born Concetta Sellecchia in The Bronx, New York to Italian parents, Primo Sellecchia and Marianna (Acampora) Sellecchia, who were married from 1952 until Primo's death in 1987. At age 12, she moved to Pomona, Rockland County, New York, and attended Pomona Junior High School. While attending Ramapo High School in Spring Valley, she first became interested in the performing arts. Although she attended Boston College, she withdrew to pursue a career in acting.

Career
Sellecca first worked as a fashion model before making her acting debut in the 1978 television film The Bermuda Depths. She starred in the short-lived CBS comedy-drama series, Flying High about the misadventures of three airline flight attendants from 1978 to 1979. In 1979, she starred in Captain America II: Death Too Soon, a television movie starring Reb Brown in the title role, and slasher film She's Dressed to Kill alongside Jessica Walter. In 1980, she starred in the another short-lived series, Beyond Westworld.

From 1981 to 1983, Sellecca starred as lawyer Pam Davidson in the ABC comedy drama series, The Greatest American Hero, which starred William Katt and Robert Culp. After Hero ended, she was released from her contract in time to audition for the part of promotions manager Christine Francis on the another ABC television drama Hotel, which starred James Brolin. She appeared in the series from 1983 to 1988. For her performance, she received Golden Globe Award nomination for Best Actress – Television Series Drama in 1987. In 1989, she starred in the high-rated miniseries Brotherhood of the Rose.

Sellecca played leading roles in a number of made-for-television films in 1980s and 1990s. From 1991 to 1992, she starred along with Greg Evigan in the CBS crime drama series P.S. I Luv U. From 1993 to 1994, she starred in the CBS drama series, Second Chances. Sellecca worked in two films in 2000s, I Saw Mommy Kissing Santa Claus (2001), and The Wild Stallion in 2009.

Personal life
Sellecca met Howard Platt in 1978, when they starred together on the television series Flying High; the couple became engaged, and moved in together when the show's filming schedule cancelled their original December 1978 wedding date. The relationship ended before any renewed wedding date could take place. Sellecca was married to actor Gil Gerard during the 1980s; they have a son, Gib. On April 4, 1992, she married pianist and then-Entertainment Tonight host John Tesh. They have one daughter, Prima. Like Tesh, Sellecca is a Christian.

Filmography

References

External links
 

1955 births
Actresses from New York (state)
American bloggers
American Christians
American female models
American film actresses
American people of Italian descent
American television actresses
American women bloggers
American women podcasters
American podcasters
Video bloggers
Women video bloggers
Boston College alumni
Living people
People from Pomona, New York
People from the Bronx
21st-century American actresses